Lwakhakha is a town in the Eastern Region of Uganda. It is one of the municipal centers in Manafwa District. The town lies across the international border from Lwakhakha, Kenya.

Location
The coordinates of Lwakhakha, Uganda are 0°47'48.0"N, 34°22'41.0"E (Latitude:0.796667; Longitude:34.378056).

Population
During the 2002 national census, the population of Lwakhakha was enumerated at 7,916. In 2010, the Uganda Bureau of Statistics (UBOS) estimated the population at 10,400. In 2011, UBOS estimated the mid-year population of to be 10,700.

Notable people
 Amos Masaba Wekesa, the founder, proprietor and managing director of Great Lakes Safaris Limited, was born here in 1973.

Landmarks
Additional landmarks in Lwakhakha include the following:

 offices of Lwakhakha Town Council
 Lwakhakha central market
 Bumbobi–Bubulo–Lwakhakha Road

See also
Bugisu sub-region
List of cities and towns in Uganda

References

External links
 Manafwa District Homepage

Populated places in Eastern Region, Uganda
Manafwa District
Kenya–Uganda border crossings
Bugisu sub-region